Duncan is an unincorporated community located in the Buckhorn Township of Harnett County, North Carolina , United States. It is a part of the Dunn Micropolitan Area, which is also a part of the greater Raleigh–Durham–Cary Combined Statistical Area (CSA) as defined by the United States Census Bureau.

Duncan was used as major source of inspiration for the fictional town of Missing Mile, North Carolina in Poppy Z. Brite's novel Drawing Blood.

Duncan was formerly known as Casma at least into the 1930s. As the rail road activity expanded along the Duncan Depot Station, the community became known as Duncan. 

Avents Creek and Parkers Creek, both tributaries to the Cape Fear River, rise in ponds near Duncan.

References
 
 

Unincorporated communities in Harnett County, North Carolina
Unincorporated communities in North Carolina